Francis Hollock Jorgensen (19 August 1902 – 25 June 1995) was an Australian rules footballer who played with Geelong and Melbourne in the Victorian Football League (VFL).

Notes

External links 

1902 births
1995 deaths
Australian rules footballers from Victoria (Australia)
Geelong Football Club players
Melbourne Football Club players
South Bendigo Football Club players